In geometry, a tetrakis hexahedron (also known as a tetrahexahedron, hextetrahedron, tetrakis cube, and kiscube) is a Catalan solid. Its dual is the truncated octahedron, an Archimedean solid.

It can be called a disdyakis hexahedron or hexakis tetrahedron as the dual of an omnitruncated tetrahedron, and as the barycentric subdivision of a tetrahedron.

Cartesian coordinates 

Cartesian coordinates for the 14 vertices of a tetrakis hexahedron centered at the origin, are the points (±3/2, 0, 0), (0, ±3/2, 0), (0, 0, ±3/2) and (±1, ±1, ±1).

The length of the shorter edges of this tetrakis hexahedron equals 3/2 and that of the longer edges equals 2. The faces are acute isosceles triangles. The larger angle of these equals  and the two smaller ones equal .

Orthogonal projections
The tetrakis hexahedron, dual of the truncated octahedron has 3 symmetry positions, two located on vertices and one mid-edge.

Uses
Naturally occurring (crystal) formations of tetrahexahedra are observed in copper and fluorite systems.

Polyhedral dice shaped like the tetrakis hexahedron are occasionally used by gamers.

A 24-cell viewed under a vertex-first perspective projection has a surface topology of a tetrakis hexahedron and the geometric proportions of the rhombic dodecahedron, with the rhombic faces divided into two triangles.

The tetrakis hexahedron appears as one of the simplest examples in building theory. Consider the Riemannian symmetric space associated to the group SL4(R). Its Tits boundary has the structure of a spherical building whose apartments are 2-dimensional spheres. The partition of this sphere into spherical simplices (chambers) can be obtained by taking the radial projection of a tetrakis hexahedron.

Symmetry
With Td, [3,3] (*332) tetrahedral symmetry, the triangular faces represent the 24 fundamental domains of tetrahedral symmetry. This polyhedron can be constructed from 6 great circles on a sphere. It can also be seen by a cube with its square faces triangulated by their vertices and face centers and a tetrahedron with its faces divided by vertices, mid-edges, and a central point.

The edges of the spherical tetrakis hexahedron belong to six great circles, which correspond to mirror planes in tetrahedral symmetry. They can be grouped into three pairs of orthogonal circles (which typically intersect on one coordinate axis each). In the images below these square hosohedra are colored red, green and blue.

Dimensions

The inclination of each triangular face of the pyramid versus the cube face is arctan(), approximately 26.565° . One edge of the isosceles triangles has length a, the other two have length , which follows by applying the Pythagorean theorem to height and base length.

Kleetope 
It can be seen as a cube with square pyramids covering each square face; that is, it is the Kleetope of the cube.

Cubic pyramid
It is very similar to the 3D net for a 4D cubic pyramid, as the net for a square based is a square with triangles attached to each edge, the net for a cubic pyramid is a cube with square pyramids attached to each face.

Related polyhedra and tilings

It is a polyhedra in a sequence defined by the face configuration V4.6.2n. This group is special for having all even number of edges per vertex and form bisecting planes through the polyhedra and infinite lines in the plane, and continuing into the hyperbolic plane for any n ≥ 7.

With an even number of faces at every vertex, these polyhedra and tilings can be shown by alternating two colors so all adjacent faces have different colors.

Each face on these domains also corresponds to the fundamental domain of a symmetry group with order 2,3,n mirrors at each triangle face vertex.

See also
Disdyakis triacontahedron
Disdyakis dodecahedron
Kisrhombille tiling
Compound of three octahedra
 Deltoidal icositetrahedron, another 24-face Catalan solid.

References

 (Section 3-9)
 (The thirteen semiregular convex polyhedra and their duals, Page 14, Tetrakishexahedron)
The Symmetries of Things 2008, John H. Conway, Heidi Burgiel, Chaim Goodman-Strauss,   (Chapter 21, Naming the Archimedean and Catalan polyhedra and tilings, page 284, Tetrakis hexahedron)

External links

Virtual Reality Polyhedra www.georgehart.com: The Encyclopedia of Polyhedra
VRML model
Conway Notation for Polyhedra Try: "dtO" or "kC"
Tetrakis Hexahedron – Interactive Polyhedron model
The Uniform Polyhedra

Catalan solids